Get Heavy is the debut album by Finnish rock band Lordi, released in 2002. Although the bass guitarist Kalma appears on the cover artwork, all bass guitars were played by the former bass guitarist Magnum, who left after the recording and before the release of the album. The album is dedicated to Magnum.

Track listing
All music and lyrics by Mr Lordi. Lyrics on "Monster Monster" were co-written by Tracy Lipp.

"Scarctic Circle Gathering"   – 1:02 
"Get Heavy"   – 3:01
"Devil Is a Loser"   – 3:29
"Rock the Hell Outta You"   – 3:06
"Would You Love a Monsterman?"   – 3:02
"Icon of Dominance"   – 4:35
"Not the Nicest Guy"   – 3:13
"Hellbender Turbulence"   – 2:46
"Biomechanic Man"   – 3:22
"Last Kiss Goodbye"   – 3:07
"Dynamite Tonite"   – 3:13
"Monster Monster"   – 3:23
"13"   – 1:06

Bonus material
"Don't Let My Mother Know" - 3:32 (North American and Japanese editions) 
Would You Love A Monsterman? (radio edit) - 03:04 (Japanese edition)

Singles
"Would You Love a Monsterman?" - released 28 October 2002
"Devil is a Loser" - released 14 April 2003

Charts

Certifications

Personnel
Credits for Get Heavy adapted from liner notes.

Lordi
 Mr Lordi – vocals, programming, artwork
 Amen – guitars, backing vocals
 Kita – drums, backing vocals
 Magnum – bass
 Enary – keyboards, piano, backing vocals

Additional musicians
 Tracy Lipp – vocals (12)

Production
 Timo Tapani Oksala – production, mixing (1, 13)
 Kevin Shirley – mixing
 Mika Jussila – mastering
 Jussi Rovanperä – engineering, editing (9)
 Mika Lindberg – artwork
 Jouko Lehtola – photography
 K. Kajava – photography

References 

2002 debut albums
Lordi albums
Drakkar Entertainment albums